Acanthodica frigida is a moth of the family Noctuidae first described by E. Dukinfield Jones in 1921. It is found in Brazil.

References

Catocalina
Moths of South America
Moths described in 1921